Boulou, also known as boulous, is a Libyan Jewish sweet bread or cake of Maghrebi Jewish origin, similar to mouna, tishpishti, or pound cake, that is traditionally made into loaves or rolls and consumed as part of the meal preceding the Yom Kippur Fast, or as part of the break fast that follows. It is most commonly found today in France, and Israel. Boulou has a sweet taste enriched with sugar, eggs, honey, oil, and golden raisins it often contains seeds such as fennel, sesame, and nigella seeds.

Overview

Boulou is traditionally consumed by Maghrebi Jews during the Hebrew month of Tishrei in the leadup to Yom Kippur, and as part of the Yom Kippur break fast. Boulou has a unique taste and texture that can be described as either a sweet cake-like bread or a bread-like cake, as it is close to both. It is also traditionally served for Rosh Hashanah. Its popularity has spread from Libyan Jewish cuisine, to Tunisian Jewish cuisine, but also to French Jewish and Israeli cuisine (owing to the large population of Libyan Jews in both countries).

Tunisian Jewish version
The Tunisian Jews have their own version of boulou due to their close proximity to the Libyan Jews. This variant is uses baking powder instead of yeast as a leavened, and is similar to the Libyan Jewish boulou but with the addition of orange zest and chopped almonds.

References

Yom Kippur
Jewish baked goods
Jewish breads
Sephardi Jewish cuisine
Israeli cuisine
Passover
Libyan Jews
Jews and Judaism in Tunisia
North African cuisine
Tripoli, Libya
Cakes